Events in the year 2017 in Morocco.

Incumbents
 King: Mohammed VI
 President of the Government: Saadeddine Othmani

Events

Deaths

18 January – Hamza al Qadiri al Boutchichi, Sufi leader (b. 1922).

References

 
2010s in Morocco
Years of the 21st century in Morocco
Morocco
Morocco